Lipno  (formerly German Neu Liepenfier) is a village in the administrative district of Gmina Połczyn-Zdrój, within Świdwin County, West Pomeranian Voivodeship, in north-western Poland. 

References

Lipno